Karl Attenberger (28 October 1885 – 19 November 1951) was a German cinematographer. He worked with Leni Riefenstahl on the 1935 propaganda documentary Triumph of the Will.

Selected filmography
 The Face Removed (1920)
 The Favourite of the Queen (1922)
 Son of the Gods (1922)
 Christopher Columbus (1923)
 To a Woman of Honour (1924)
 The Adventurous Wedding (1925)
 The Searching Soul (1925)
 Superfluous People (1926)
 The Villa in Tiergarten Park (1927)
 Poor Little Colombine (1927)
 Klettermaxe (1927)
 The Lady in Black (1928)
 Give Me Life (1928)
 Children's Tragedy (1928)
 Andreas Hofer (1929)
 Der Grenzjäger (1930)
 When the Evening Bells Ring (1930)
 The Peak Scaler (1933)
 Hubertus Castle (1934)
 The Monastery's Hunter (1935)
 Home Guardsman Bruggler (1936)
 The Hunter of Fall (1936)
 Storms in May (1938)
 Der rettende Engel (1940)
 Frau Holle (1948)

Bibliography
Rother, Rainer & Bott, Martin H. Leni Riefenstahl: The Seduction of Genius.Continuum International Publishing 2003.

External links

1885 births
1951 deaths
German cinematographers
Film people from Munich